Walk East on Beacon is a 1952 American film noir drama film directed by Alfred L. Werker and starring George Murphy, Finlay Currie, and Virginia Gilmore. It was released by Columbia Pictures. The screenplay was inspired by a May 1951 Reader's Digest article by J. Edgar Hoover entitled "The Crime of the Century: The Case of the A-Bomb Spies."  The article covers the meeting of German physicist and atomic spy Klaus Fuchs and American chemist Harry Gold as well as details of the Soviet espionage network in the United States. Gold's testimony would later lead to the case against Julius and Ethel Rosenberg for treason. The film substitutes real atomic spying with vague top secret scientific programs. Extensive location shooting was done in New England, around Washington Union Station and in FBI laboratories.

Plot summary

Federal agent Belden (George Murphy) is assigned to locate the communist mastermind behind the leak, and to trace all avenues of informational access utilized by the Communists. Professor Albert Kafer (Finlay Currie) is the space-weapons scientist who is being blackmailed by the Reds into cooperating with them, while Alexi Laschenkov (Karel Stepanek) is the top Eastern-Bloc spy.

Using state of the art technology, such as an early miniature video camera, and ingenious methods like a roomful of foreign language lip readers, the G-men crack the case and with the help of the US Coast Guard rescue the professor before he can be spirited away by submarine.

Cast
 George Murphy as Inspector James 'Jim' Belden
 Finlay Currie as Professor Albert Kafer
 Virginia Gilmore as Millie / Teresa Zalenko
 Karel Stepanek as Alexi Laschenkov / Gregory Anders
 Louisa Horton as Mrs. Elaine Wilben
 Peter Capell as Chris Zalenko / Gino
 Bruno Wick as Luther Danzig
 Jack Manning as Melvin Foss / Vincent
 Karl Weber as FBI Agent Charlie Reynolds
 Robert A. Dunn as Dr. Wincott (as Rev. Robert Dunn)
 Vilma Kurer as Mrs. Rita Foss
 Michael Garrettas Michael Dorndoff / Frank Torrance
 Lotte Palfi Andor as Mrs. Anna Kafer (as Lotte Palfi)
 Ernest Graves as Robert Martin
 Robert Carroll as Boldany
 George Roy Hill as Nicholas Wilben
 Helen Mitchell as one of the lip readers

Comic book adaption
 Fawcett Motion Picture Comics #113 (November 1952)

References

External links
 Walk East on Beacon at IMDB
 
 
 
 

1952 films
1950s spy drama films
American anti-communist propaganda films
American spy drama films
American black-and-white films
Cold War spy films
Films critical of communism
Columbia Pictures films
Films scored by Louis Applebaum
Films adapted into comics
1950s English-language films
1950s American films